The Conwy Valley Railway Museum is located at Betws-y-Coed railway station, Betws-y-Coed, North Wales, on the site of the old railway goods yard.

Museum
The museum was founded starting with a former standard gauge railway carriage which today acts as a licensed buffet and restaurant car. The current museum was built later, and contains various railway artefacts.

Miniature railway
The railway is a single track running around the perimeter of the site. It is curved round 180 degrees at the South of the site with a balloon loop at each end which are superimposed at the North of the site. Use of several spring points allow trains to complete a circuit without manual adjustment of any points. Passing loops allow more than one train to use the circuit simultaneously.

Tramway
This is one of only two electric tramways in Wales (the other being a short  gauge electric tramway in Heath Park, Cardiff, owned by Cardiff Model Engineering Society).

See also
 British narrow gauge railways
 Conwy Valley Line
 List of British railway museums
 Miniature Railways

References

 Conwy Valley Railway Museum website

Betws-y-Coed
Museums in Conwy County Borough
Railway museums in Wales
7¼ in gauge railways in Wales
15 in gauge railways in Wales
1970s establishments in Wales